Rajakumari is a 2013 Indian Tamil-language soap opera that aired on Sun TV from 28 January 2013 to 7 June 2013 for 94 episodes.  The show premiered on Monday January 2013. It aired Monday through Friday at 8:30pm IST and stars Ramya Krishnan, Sarath Babu, Geetha, Nalini and Menaka.

The show Directed by Raja, writer by S. Ashok Kumar and screenplay by R. Vijay. The show last aired on 7 June 2013 and ended with 94 episodes. It was also aired in Sri Lanka Tamil Channel on Vasantham TV.

Plot
Nilampari (Ramya Krishnan) wants to lead a simple and peaceful life. But people around her have different motives. This causes many problems to her, and she faces them with her positive energy and support from a few faithful friends and relatives.

Cast
 Ramya Krishnan as Nilambari
 Sarath Babu as Sivalingam
 Raja Krishnamoorthy  as Mahalingam
 Oorvambu Lakshmi as Selvi
 Geetha as Lakshmi Mahalingam
 Nalini as Malliga
 Menaka as  Durga Sivalingam
 Afser babu as Shankar
 Latha Rao as Manju
 Sidharath as Sanjay
 Ramesh as 
 Kutty Pooja as Sujatha
 Bhuvana (Bhavana) as Prithi 
 Sathish as Sathish
 Karthi as Pradeep
 Venkat as Kathirava
 Kaviya as Nandhini
 Ashritha Kingini as Deepa 
 Nathan Shyam as Mahesh
 Vetrivel as Ramesh
 T.T.V.Ramanujam as Sami gurukal
 --as Rajagopal
 Lenin Anpan

International broadcast
The Series was released on 28 January 2013 on Sun TV. The Show was also broadcast internationally on Channel's international distribution. It airs in Sri Lanka, Singapore, Malaysia, South East Asia, Middle East, United States, Canada, Europe, Oceania, South Africa and Sub Saharan Africa on Sun TV. The show's episodes were released on Vision Time Tamil YouTube channel from 19 May 2016.

  In Sri Lanka Tamil Channel on Vasantham TV. It aired Monday through Friday at 11:00AM SST.

See also
 List of programs broadcast by Sun TV

References

External links
 Official Website 

Sun TV original programming
2013 Tamil-language television series debuts
Tamil-language television shows
2013 Tamil-language television series endings